Catherine Griset is a French politician who was elected as a Member of the European Parliament in 2019.

References

Year of birth missing (living people)
Living people
National Rally (France) MEPs
MEPs for France 2019–2024
21st-century women MEPs for France